Paialvo is a Portuguese freguesia ("civil parish") located in the municipality of Tomar. The population in 2011 was 2,599, in an area of 22.31 km².

Paialvo Parish consists of thirteen places/villages: Bexiga, Carrascal, Carrazede, Casal Barreleiro, Charneca da Peralva, Curvaceiras, Delongo, Fontaínhas, Mouchões, Paialvo, Peralva, and Soudos e Vila Nova.

In 1801 its population was 1407 inhabitants.

References

Freguesias of Tomar